is a former Japanese football player.

Playing career
Nagamine was born in Miyazaki Prefecture on May 12, 1973. After graduating from Kansai University, he joined newly was promoted to J1 League club, Kyoto Purple Sanga in 1996. On May 18, he debuted as center back against Grampus Eight. However he could only play this match and retired end of 1996 season.

Club statistics

References

External links

kyotosangadc

1973 births
Living people
Kansai University alumni
Association football people from Miyazaki Prefecture
Japanese footballers
J1 League players
Kyoto Sanga FC players
Association football defenders